Mohd Nizaruddin Yusof (born 10 November 1979) is a former Malaysian footballer who operates as a striker. He last played for Penjara FC in the Malaysia FAM League. He played for Malaysian national team and also has played for the Malaysia Under-23 in 2001 Southeast Asian Games.
He is well known for his finishing ability.

He became an instant hit with the local fans (Selangor and MPPJ) and also the envy of other clubs in the M-League. In November 2007, he signed for Perlis. He did not play when Perlis won the Malaysia Charity Shield. He moved to PDRM in 2008 on a season long deal. After his contract with PDRM ended, he returned to Perlis in 2009. With Perlis, he won the 2009 Malaysia Super League Golden Boot award scoring 18 goals and becoming runners up with the team at the end of the 2009 season.

After a year with Perlis, Nizaruddin also played with KL PLUS and Felda United before joining PKNS in April 2012, on a free transfer. In April 2013, Nizaruddin joined ATM.

Nizaruddin started representing Malaysia during 1999 Dubai Tour, 2000 Merdeka Tournament and 2000 AFF Championship under Abdul Rahman Ibrahim. Since then he was selected to be part of the Malaysia squad, making him one of the more experienced players on the Malaysian national team. Although he did not produce many goals with the national team, he was adept at producing assists for his team mates to score.

He also a sports commentator for Malaysia television Astro Arena.

International goals

Honours

Player
Kuala Lumpur
Malaysia Charity Shield: 2000

Selangor
Malaysia FA Cup: 2001
Malaysia Cup: 2002
Malaysia Charity Shield: 2002

MPPJ
Malaysia Premier League: 2004
Malaysia Charity Shield: 2004

Negeri Sembilan
Malaysia Super League: 2005-06

InternationalMalaysia U-23'''
 SEA Games :  Silver 2001

Individual
 2009 Malaysia Super League Golden Boot (18 goals)

References

External links
 
 

1979 births
Association football forwards
Living people
Malaysian footballers
Malaysia international footballers
Perlis FA players
Selangor FA players
Negeri Sembilan FA players
Kuala Lumpur City F.C. players
PKNS F.C. players
Sportspeople from Kuala Lumpur
Malaysian people of Malay descent
Southeast Asian Games silver medalists for Malaysia
Southeast Asian Games medalists in football
Competitors at the 2001 Southeast Asian Games